KYNO (940 AM) is a radio station licensed to Fresno, California and is owned by John Ostlund and Katrina Ostlund. KYNO airs an oldies format, switching to Christmas music for much of December. KYNO's radio studios and offices are on Fulton Street in Fresno and its transmitter is off Avenue 384 in Monson, California.  

KYNO operates with 50,000 watts around the clock, the highest power permitted for American AM radio stations. 940 KYNO is the most powerful Oldies radio station in America with daytime coverage from Sacramento to Bakersfield and throughout the Central Coast of California. But because AM 940 is a clear channel frequency, KYNO uses a directional antenna to avoid interfering with Class A stations XEQ in Mexico City and CFNV in Montreal. Even with these restrictions, it can be heard across much of the Western United States at night with a good radio.

Station history

KFRE 
KFRE was first licensed on August 18, 1937 on 1190 kHz. It moved to 890 kHz in 1939 then to 920 kHz in 1941 as a result of the North American Regional Broadcasting Agreement (NARBA). It moved to the current 940 kHz frequency in 1942.

KYNO
KYNO from 1956 and throughout the 1960s and 1970s, was a Top-40 station, and was the #1 "Hooper" rated station in Fresno under the ownership of Gene Chenault. KYNO was the testing ground for the "Boss Radio" format that would be adopted at major market stations such as KHJ, Los Angeles; KFRC, San Francisco and CKLW, Windsor-Detroit.

Program director Bill Drake and disc jockeys such as K.O. Bailey, Les Turpin, Ed Mitchell, and Gary Mack went against the cross town rival 1340 KMAK (now KCBL), its program director Ron Jacobs and DJs Robert W. Morgan (who would become legendary in Los Angeles), Jim Price, Glenn Adams, Jay Stevens, Frank Terry & Tom Maule. This radio war is now known as the "Battle Of Fresno."

Eventually, KYNO stopped playing music and for a time was an all-sports station that carried the Fresno Grizzlies of the Pacific Coast League.

From 1999 until August 30, 2008, KYNO was a Spanish language Christian music and preaching station, known as Radio Guadalupe.

KYNO changed frequencies from 1300 AM to 940 AM on April 1, 2010 and then changed frequencies from 940 AM to 1430 AM on October 6, 2012.

KFIG
In 2008, the station was purchased by John Ostlund, owner of FM station KJWL. 

The new ownership changed to a politically conservative news/talk format (one of five such formats in the region) on September 1, 2008, starting with a lineup featuring nationally syndicated talk show hosts, such as Bill O'Reilly, Dennis Miller, Dr. Laura, Don Imus and Larry King Live.

On October 6, 2012, KYNO dropped the news talk format to become a full-time sports radio station, as an ESPN Radio Network affiliate under new call letters, KFIG. It also broadcast some local sports shows in the afternoon and early evening. KFIG carried both San Francisco Giants and Oakland Athletics baseball games, as well as San Francisco 49ers and Las Vegas Raiders football games.

KYNO's comeback
On July 19, 2021, KYNO returned to the 940 dial position and began broadcasting oldies music. The KFIG call letters and sports format moved to 1430.

Previous logos

References

External links
KYNO official website

Fresno Bee Article August 28, 2008
FCC History Cards for KYNO

YNO
Oldies radio stations in the United States
Fresno State Bulldogs football
Radio stations established in 1937
1937 establishments in California